Kolmikärki (Trident) is CMX's 1990 debut album. Notwithstanding the punk roots of the early CMX, the musical style of the album varies greatly. There's hardcore, heavy metal, acid rock, some jazz, ballads and even a waltz. A. W. Yrjänä's lyrics on the album contain a lot of religious imagery for which the band is still known. The lyrics have been influenced by a variety of religions, including Buddhism and Christianity, as well as drawing influence from shamanism. CMX's music has changed significantly since this early album, but their enthusiasm for experimenting with different musical styles has lived on.

The CD version of Kolmikärki released by Bad Vugum also contains the Raivo EP originally published in 1989. The "Gold" version of the album, released in 2002 contains both Raivo and CMX's first EP, Johannes Kastaja, originally released in 1987.

Track listing
Music and lyrics by A. W. Yrjänä, arranged by CMX.
 "Johdatus salatieteisiin" – 4:05 ("Introduction to the Occult")
 "Sika ja perkele" – 2:25 ("Pig and the Devil")
 "Nahkaparturi" – 1:51 ("Skinbarber")
 "Kaikki nämä kädet" – 2:30 ("All These Hands")
 "Götterdämmerung" – 2:05
 "Kuolemattomuuden ääni" – 2:02 ("The Voice of Immortality")
 "Pyydä mahdotonta" – 2:57 ("Ask for the Impossible")
 "Pyörivät sähkökoneet" – 3:26 ("Rotating Electrical Machines")
 "Taivas ja helvetti" – 2:19 ("Heaven and Hell")
 "Voittamaton" – 2:05 ("Unbeatable")
 "Suuri äiti" – 3:48 ("The Great Mother")
 "Kolmas Johannes" – 1:51 ("The Third John")
 "Hiljaisuuden pelko" – 1:35 ("Fear of Silence")
 "Liekkisusi, sulkakäärme" – 6:07  ("Flamewolf, Feathersnake")

Credits 

 Pekka Kanniainen - Drums
 A. W. Yrjänä - Bass, Vocals
 Kimmo Suomalainen - Guitars

Visitors 
 Tepa Lukkarinen - Lead guitar ("Pyörivät sähkökoneet")

See also 
 CMX discography

Notes 

1990 albums
CMX (band) albums

fi:Kolmikärki